The Deepest End, Live in Concert is a two-CD live album and DVD video by American southern rock band Gov't Mule, released on October 7, 2003. It was recorded in New Orleans on May 3, 2003.

In 2003, after recording The Deep End, Volume 1 (2001) and Volume 2 (2002), Gov't Mule gathered several musicians that had worked on the Deep End sessions as well as a few other friends for a live concert. This was intended as the culmination of the Deep End project, which was a tribute to their late bassist Allen Woody, who died in 2000. The release also marked the first Gov't Mule CD to feature keyboardist Danny Louis as a full-time member.

The album is one of the 10 best "live jam releases of this century" according to the August 2006 issue of Guitar One magazine.

Track listing

Disc one
"Bad Little Doggie" (Haynes/Woody/Abts) - 4:04
"Game Face" (Haynes) - 8:36
"Larger Than Life" (Haynes) - 6:11
"Blind Man in the Dark" (Haynes) - 15:38
"Which Way Do We Run?" (Haynes) - 6:56
"Fool's Moon" (Haynes) - 6:11
"Sco-Mule" (Haynes) - 8:56
"Patchwork Quilt" (Haynes) - 6:06
"Lay of the Sunflower" (Haynes/Hunter) - 7:35
"John the Revelator" (traditional) - 6:59

Disc two
"When Doves Cry/Beautifully Broken" (Prince/Haynes/Louis) - 9:49
"Time to Confess" (Haynes) - 8:27
"Banks of the Deep End" (Haynes/Gordon/Linitz) - 6:45
"32/20 Blues" (Johnson) - 12:10
"Goin' Down" (Nix) - 5:58
"Slow Happy Boys" (Haynes) - 7:29
"I Shall Return" (Haynes) - 7:29
"Trying Not to Fall" (Haynes/Louis) - 5:48
"Drivin' Rain" (Haynes) - 5:03
"Soulshine" (Haynes) - 7:41

DVD
"Bad Little Doggie" (Haynes/Woody/Abts) - 4:04
"Blind Man in the Dark" (Haynes) - 15:38
"Sco-Mule" (Haynes) - 8:56
"Lay of the Sunflower" (Haynes/Hunter) - 7:35
"John the Revelator" (traditional) - 6:59
"Chameleon" (Hancock/Jackson/Mason/Maupin) - 16:25
"When Doves Cry/Beautifully Broken" (Prince/Haynes/Louis) - 9:49
"Mule" (Haynes/Woody/Abts) - 13:41
"Banks of the Deep End" (Haynes/Gordon/Linitz) - 6:45
"On Your Way Down" (Toussaint) - 8:48
"Down and Out in NYC" (Chandler/Devorzon) - 7:36
"Maybe I'm a Leo" (Blackmore/Gillan/Glover/Lord/Paice) - 5:45
"Voodoo Chile" (Hendrix) - 14:33
"Politician" (Bruce/Brown) 6:50
"Guitar Solo - Drum Solo" (Haynes/Abts) - 8:18
"Sweet Leaf" (Iommi/Osbourne/Butler/Ward) - 5:04
"War Pigs" (Iommi/Osborne/Butler/Ward) - 12:06
"Greasy Granny's Gopher Gravy, Pts. 1 & 2" (Haynes/Claypool/Abts) - 12:01
"Wasted Time" (Henley/Frey) - 5:50
"Thorazine Shuffle" (Haynes/Abts) - 11:39

Personnel

Gov't Mule
Warren Haynes - vocals, guitar, audio production
Matt Abts - drums
Danny Louis - keyboards, guitar

Bassists
Jack Casady
Les Claypool
Jason Newsted
George Porter Jr.
Dave Schools
Roger Glover
Mike Gordon
Paul Jackson
Conrad Lozano
Will Lee
Greg Rzab
Rob Wasserman
Victor Wooten

Additional personnel
Michael Barbiero - mixing
Michael Drumm - directing and video production
Karl Denson - horns
Dirty Dozen Brass Band horn section
Béla Fleck - banjo
David Hidalgo - vocals, guitar
Sonny Landreth - guitar
Ivan Neville - keyboards
Fred Wesley - trombone
Bernie Worrell - keyboards

References

Gov't Mule albums
2003 live albums
ATO Records albums